Rajeev Ram and Joe Salisbury defeated Juan Sebastián Cabal and Robert Farah in the final, 6–4, 3–6, [10–7]. Their victory earned them their first ATP Tour Masters 1000 on clay and their second Masters 1000 title overall.

Nikola Mektić and Mate Pavić were the defending champions, but lost in the quarterfinals to Cabal and Farah.

Seeds
The top four seeds received a bye into the second round.

Draw

Finals

Top half

Bottom half

References

External links
 Main draw

Doubles
Monte-Carlo Masters - Doubles